Johann Kaspar Mörikofer (11 October 1799, in Frauenfeld, Switzerland – 17 October 1877, in Riesbach) was a Swiss literary and ecclesiastical historian.

Biography
He studied theology at the Carolinum in Zürich, and from 1822 to 1851 was provisor and rector of city schools in Frauenfeld. From 1851 to 1869 he served as a pastor in Gottlieben. He obtained honorary doctorates at the universities of Zürich (PhD, 1872) and Basel (theology, 1876).

Works
His historical works have scientific value and literary charm; they include:
Die schweizerische Mundart im Verhältnis zur hochdeutschen Schriftsprache (1838) – The Swiss dialect in relation to the High German written language.
Klopstock in Zürich im Jahre 1750–1751 (1851) – Friedrich Gottlieb Klopstock in Zürich in the years 1750/51. 
Die schweizerische Litteratur des 18. Jarhunderts (1861) – Swiss literature in the 18th century.
Ulrich Zwingli: Nach den urkundlichen Quellen (1867–69) – Ulrich Zwingli: According to documentary sources.
Geschichte der evangelischen Flüchtlinge in der Schweiz (1876) – History of Protestant refugees In Switzerland.

References
 
 

1799 births
1877 deaths
19th-century Swiss historians
Swiss male writers
Swiss Protestant ministers
People from Frauenfeld